Arthur Korb (June 21, 1909 – March 16, 2003) was an American songwriter of popular music songs.

He was born in Boston, Massachusetts. He attended Harvard University, earning the degrees of Bachelor of Arts and Master of Arts there. In 1953 Korb joined ASCAP.

Among the songs which he wrote were "Acres of Diamonds," "Autumn Avenue," "The Fool of the Year," "Go On with the Wedding," "A Man Is Ten Feet Tall," "My Truly True Love," "She's Gonna Be Mine," "Take Me Home," "It Takes Time", and "Tell Me."

The song "It Takes Time" was recorded by Louis Armstrong, Doris Day, Benny Goodman and Johnny Mercer among others.

One of his collaborators was Milton Yakus, the owner of the former Ace Recording Studios in Boston, Massachusetts.

Korb died in San Juan, Puerto Rico in 2003.

Musicians from Boston
Songwriters from Massachusetts
Harvard University alumni
1909 births
2003 deaths
20th-century American musicians